Leadtek Research, Inc. is a Taiwanese company, founded in 1986, which focuses on research and development that is specialized in the design and manufacture of graphics cards.

Products 
Products in Leadtek's Computer Group include 3D graphics accelerators (of the NVIDIA GeForce line, mainstream and workstation-class). Currently, Leadtek's product lines are covering computer gaming graphics cards, workstation graphics cards, AI software and hardware, AI cloud supercomputing workstations, desktop virtualization Zero Client/Thin Client, smart medical/health care, school research and big data.

For smart medical, amor H2 health band won the 2019 Taiwan Excellence Award and the 2018 APICTA Asia-Pacific Information and Communication Technology Alliance Awards

History

Key dates
1997  Pioneer of GPS products since 1997 (one of Taiwan’s earliest).
2000  Leadtek GPS module became “de facto” Smart Antenna.module (9531) SiRF Star I GPS module (9520).
2001  Mini size GPS antenna for PDA application .9532 Smart Antenna.9540/9542/9543 SS-2 module.
2002  9543LP module/ 9546 SiRFXtrac module .9546 SiRFXtrac module.9534 CF card receiver.
2003  9551 SD card receiver.9547 SiRFLoc/ SiRFXtrac module.9800 2t host-based module .First Bluetooth GPS Receiver 9537-SiRF Star II.
2004  First GPS receiver (9553)-SiRF Star III chipset.First SMD module (9548)-SiRF Star III chipset.First tiny Bluetooth GPS Receiver 9553.SiRF Star II SMD module (9805).First GPS receiver with RDS/TMC function (9815) to European market.
2005  All-in-one GPS Navigator (9700)-Win CE4.0 platform.
2006  9101LP/9548SLP/9552LP module (SiRF Star III).9805ST/9540G/9121/9122 module (SiRF Star II).9500EVK evaluation kit.9559X Bluetooth GPS receiver.
2007  9450 GPS Smart Antenna.9569 Bluetooth GPS receiver.9750/9752 PND (Personal Navigation Device).
2008  LR 8M03 LBS Tracker.
2016  Cooperated with the Canadian Nano Research company to develop “NewClean long effect nano-spray”.
2017  Leadtek became a certified partner of NVIDIA DLI (Deep Learning Institute) and started AI talent training course.
2019Leadtek was awarded " Taiwan i sports (Certificate of Corporate Wellness) " by Sports Administration, Ministry of Education
2020H2 Plus Wearable ECG Recorder won the 29th Taiwan Excellence Award (2021)
2021Leadtek workstations have been validated by NVIDIA as NVIDIA-Certified Systems
2022Leadtek has been certified by three international management systems: SGS ISO 27001 (information security), ISO 27017 (cloud service information security) and ISO 27701 (privacy information), providing customers with system information security, cloud security and personal information security.

See also
 List of companies of Taiwan

References

1986 establishments in Taiwan
Electronics companies of Taiwan
Graphics hardware companies
Manufacturing companies based in New Taipei
Taiwanese brands
Taiwanese companies established in 1986
Videotelephony